Events from the year 2007 in Nepal.

Incumbents
Prime Minister: Girija Prasad Koirala
Chief Justice: Dilip Kumar Poudel (until 8 September), Kedar Prasad Giri (starting 5 October)

Events

 Nepal became a federal republic.

See also
Years in India
Years in China

References

 
21st century in Nepal
Years of the 21st century in Nepal
2000s in Nepal
Nepal